Pero Zubac (born 30 May 1945) is a Serbian and former Yugoslav author, poet, screenwriter, academic and journalist. He is a member of the Association of Journalists of Serbia and the Association of Writers of Serbia. In 2021 he was awarded the Order of Karađorđe's Star.

Works 

 Tišina govori o ljudima, co-author, Klub mladih pisaca, Zrenjanin, 1964.
 Nevermore, Matica srpska, Novi Sad, 1967
 Razgovori sa Gospodinom, Kulturni centar Radničkog univerziteta, Novi Sad, 1971
 Hoću: neću, Children's poetry, Opštinska zajednica kulture i Društvo književnih stvaralaca Zrenjanin, 1972.
 Triptih (co-author with M. Antić, M. Nastasijević), Opštinska zajednica kulture, Novi Sad, 1973
 Zakasnela pisma, „Stražilovo”, Novi Sad, 1973
 Mostarske kiše, Radnički univerzitet „Radivoj Ćirpanov“, Novi Sad, 1974
 Razlog blagosti. „Bratstvo-jedinstvo”, Novi Sad, 1975
 Uzmorje, Matica srpska Novi Sad, 1978
 Tito je naš drug, „Dečje novine” Gornji Milanovac, 1979
 Što se Darja na me ljuti, Children's poetry, „Jež”, Belgrade, 1979, 1980
 Neko drugi, Gradska biblioteka „Žarko Zrenjanin“, Zrenjanin, 1980
 Ljuvene, „Mostarska komuna”, Mostar, 1980
 Otvoreni san, „Minerva”, Belgrade, 1980
 San im čuva istorija, narrative poetry, Kragujevac, 1980
 Mostarske kiše i neko drugo more, „Mladost”, Zagreb, 1980, 1981
 Pisma poverljiva, Children's poetry, „Jež”, Belgrade, 1981
 Tito je naš drug, „Veselin Masleša” Sarajevo, 1982
 Ram za sliku leta, „Mladost”, Zagreb, 1983
 Vukovarski uspomenar, poema za svetilište u Dudiku, „OK SSRNH Vukovar”, 1984
 Da ne čuje neko, Children's poetry, Detinjstvo, „Dnevnik”, Novi Sad, 1984
 Dečje srce, Children's poetry, Gradska narodna biblioteka „Žarko Zrenjanin“, Zrenjanin, 1984
 Miris bejturana, „BIGZ”, Belgrade, 1984
 Pero Zubac o…, Children's poetry, Gradska biblioteka Zrenjanin, 1985
 Postoji vatra, poema za svetilište u Sremskoj Mitrovici, Sremske novine Sremska Mitrovica, 1985
 Pesmar, Znanje, Zagreb, 1986., Podešavanje čula, Forum marketprint, Novi Sad, 1988
 Duša dečja, Children's poetry, Zrinski, Čakovec, Crvena zvezda-Agencija, Belgrade, 1989
 Doba kiša. Zrinski, Čakovec, Crvena zvezda – Agencija Belgrade, 1989
 Knjiga šutnje, Zrinski Čakovec, Crvena zvezda – Agencija, Belgrade, 1989
 Kiše, „Beletra”, Belgrade, 1989
 Mostarske kiše ili žeđ za jugom, „Dnevnik”, Novi Sad, 1989
 Nokturno, Zrinski Čakovec, Crvena zvezda – Agencija, Belgrade, 1989
 Sat srca, Zrinski, Čakovec, Crvena zvezda- Agencija, Belgrade, 1989
 U modrom vrtu, Zrinski Čakovec, Crvena zvezda – Agencija, Belgrade, 1989
 A šta ću ja, Children's poetry, Dragan Laković, Saraorci, 1991
 Mostarske kiše i nove pesme, „Beletra”, Belgrade, 1993
 Porodična večera, „Unireks”, Nikšić, 1993.
 Deca rastu kao kuće, Children's poetry, „Unireks”, Podgorica, 1996
 Deca mogu nemoguće, Children's poetry, „Unireks”, Podgorica, 1996
 Budi prijatelj vetru, „Dečja literatura”, Belgrade, 1996
 Zmajevci, Children's poetry, „Slovo”, Vrbas, 1997
 Ovo sam ja, „BMG”, Belgrade, 1997
 Let iznad detinjstva, „Smederevska pesnička jesen”, Smederevo, 1998
 Ne šalji kišu, „KZ V. Mijušković”, Nikšić, „Oktoih”, Podgorica, „Libertas”, Bijelo Polje, 1999
 Ptice u grudima, Children's poetry, „Srpska knjiga” Ruma and „Nolit” Belgrade, 2001
 Tamne rime, „Čigoja”, Belgrade, 2001
 Mostarske kiše, selected poems, „Srpska knjiga”, Ruma, 2002
 Molitva za Slađanu Đorđević, „Stojkov”, Novi Sad,2002
 Pesme iz šezdesetih, „Stylos”, Novi Sad, 2003
 Pesme iz sedamdesetih, „Stylos”, Novi Sad, 2003
 Pesme iz osamdesetih, „Stylos”, Novi Sad, 2003
 Pesme iz devedesetih, „Stylos”, Novi Sad, 2003
 Nove pesme, „Stylos”, Novi Sad, 2003
 Kako se raste, „Portal”, Belgrade, 2004
 Najlepše pesme Pera Zubca, „Prosveta” Belgrade, 2004
 Baštovite pesme, „Srpska knjiga”, Ruma, 2004
 Razlog blagosti, „Orpheus”, Novi Sad, 2005
 Povratak Mostaru, „Art Rabic”, Sarajevo, 2005
 Lijepo ponašanje, „Dis”, Čačak, 2005
 Molitvenik sna, „Instel” Novi Sad i „Srska knjiga” Ruma, 2007
 Kraljević i pesnik, novel for children, „Bookland”, Belgrade, 2007
 Povratak Mostaru (i Mostarske kiše), sa objavljenim odjecima promocija u Mostaru, Sarajevu i Banja Luci, „Media invent”, Novi Sad, 2006
 Mostarske kiše, „Žiravac”, Požega, 2007
 Mostarske kiše, „Media invent” Novi Sad i „Srpska knjiga” Ruma, 2006, 2008, 2009
 Mostarske kiše, „Admiral book”, Belgrade, 2009
 Mostarske kiše, „Media invent”, Novi Sad, 2005, 2006, 2008, 2010
 Lenka Dunđerska, lirska studija, „Media invent” Novi Sad i „Tiski cvet” Novi Sad, 2010, 2011
 Perodije, „Vuk”, Loznica, 2011
 Hor bečkih dečaka u sinagogi, „Prosveta”, Belgrade, 2012
 Mostarske kiše, edition with translation in 14 languages, „Admiral book“, Belgrade, 2015 
 Pesmarica za Milenu, Children's poetry, Gradska bibioteka „Žarko Zrenjanin“, Zrenjanin, 2016
 Glasovi u tišini, pesme, „Art Rabic“, Sarajevo 2017
 Mostarske kiše, „Smederevski pesnički festival”, 2018
 Izabrane pesme, „Gramatik“ Belgrade, 2018
 Knjiga koja se još piše, 57 pesama, „Krovovi”, br. 96-100, Sremski Karlovci, 2018
 Pisma D.T. Na nebesku adresu, „Prometej” – „ Instel“, Novi Sad, 2019
 Klupko života, „Art Rabic“, Sarajevo, 2019
 Mostarske kiše i neka druga zemlja, „Art Rabic” – „Mikulić knjige”, Sarajevo, 2020

Anthologies 
 20 pripovedača, dvadeset vojvođanskih pripovedača, Društvo književnih stvaralaca Zrenjanin, 1972
 Romor ravnice, poezija pesnika Vojvodine, Centar za kulturu, Zrenjanin, 1974
 Vojvodina peva Titu, pesme o Josipu Brozu Titu vojvođanskih pesnika, „Bratstvo jedinstvo”, Novi Sad, 1977
 Slovo ljubve, Serbian love poetry, „BMG”, Belgrade, 1987
 Uzalud je budim, Serbian love poetry, „BMG”, Belgrade, 1987
 Pohvala ljubavi, Serbian love poetry, „BMG”, Belgrade, 1987
 Velika tajna, Serbian love poetry, „BMG”, Belgrade, 1987
 Pelud sveta, Serbian love poetry, „BMG”, Belgrade, 1987
 Kao da sam te sanjao, anthology of world poetry about love, Gradska biblioteka, Zrenjanin, 1988
 Ptica detinjstva, Serbian Children's poetry, „Jefimija”, Kragujevac, 1997
 Zlatni stihovi, „Verzal pres”, Belgrade, 1998
 Knjiga nežnosti, „Verzal pres”, Belgrade, 1999
 Među javom i med snom, „Srpska knjiga”, Ruma, Serbian poetry of the 19th and 20th century, 2004
 Sa one strane duge, anthology of Serbian Children's poetry, „Srpska knjiga”, Ruma, 2006
 Pod jednom drukčijom zvezdom, vojvođanski pesnici o Vojvodini, „Srpska knjiga”, Ruma, 2008
 Kad srce zasvetluca, anthology of Serbian Children's poetry, „Srpska knjiga”, Ruma, 2009
 Prirodopis, „Bookland“, Belgrade, 2013

Dramas 
 Mudbol, co-author, 1968
 Izbacivač, TV drama, 1979
 Vratio se Nikoletina, co-author, 2000
 Rodino dete, „Kliker“ 2001

Libretto 
 Banović Strahinja, 2001
 Lenka Dunđerska, 2001
 Milica SS, kći bregova, 2012

References

1945 births
Living people
People from Nevesinje
Serbs of Bosnia and Herzegovina
Serbian male poets
Serbian male writers
20th-century Serbian poets
University of Novi Sad alumni